The 1994 Scottish Cup Final was the final match of the 1993–94 Scottish Cup competition, the 109th edition of the most important cup competition in Scottish football. It was played between Dundee United and Rangers at Hampden Park, Glasgow on 21 May 1994. 

Dundee United won the game 1–0, with a goal by Craig Brewster. Following a mix-up between Rangers' goalkeeper Ally Maxwell and Dave McPherson, United's Christian Dailly rolled a cross-shot across goal. The ball bounced off the post but Brewster was there to tap in.

It was Dundee United's first Scottish Cup victory, having previously played in six finals, but losing all of them. Dundee United manager Ivan Golac was the first manager from outside the United Kingdom to win the Scottish Cup.

Background
Rangers were seeking to complete what was described as "a Double Treble" having won all three domestic trophies in 1992-1993 and having already won the League Cup and the Premier Division. United on the other hand had failed to win the Scottish Cup despite reaching six finals, and had lost four finals within the previous ten years. Moreover the side had only finished 2 points clear of being relegated from the Premier Division. Consequently Rangers were heavy favourites for the match, although, as Dundee United player Craig Brewster would note, United had beaten Rangers 3-0 at Ibrox a few months earlier.

Match

Summary

Both sides fielded attacking line-ups and had scoring opportunities in the first half, and Dundee United had a penalty claim turned down in the 11th minute, but the match remained goalless at halftime. The only goal of the game eventually came two minutes into the second half.  Rangers' goalkeeper Ally Maxwell saw his attempt at a clearance come off Dundee United's Christian Dailly who was then able to shoot towards the goal. His shot hit the post, but his team mate Craig Brewster was on hand to score. Rangers strove for an equalizer, their closest effort being an Alexei Mikhailichenko shot that was superbly saved by United's Guido van de Kamp, but they were ultimately unable to break down Dundee United's defence.

Details

Teams

Attendance
At the time of the match Hampden Park was undergoing major reconstruction work. As this was only partly completed its capacity was reduced. Consequently, only 38,000 tickets for the final were available (with Rangers being given 19,000 and Dundee United being allocated 12,000 and the rest going to sponsors and other clubs). The match was a sell-out, and ultimately 37,450 people attended the final. Authors Mike Watson and Matthew Watson suggested that the bulk of the apparent 550 non-attenders were probably drawn from tickets issued to sponsors.

References

1994
Cup Final
Scottish Cup Final 1994
Scottish Cup Final 1994
20th century in Glasgow
May 1994 sports events in the United Kingdom